Maria (2 July 1363 – 25 May 1401) was Queen of Sicily and Duchess of Athens and Neopatria from 1377 until her death.

Accession 

Born in Catania, she was the daughter and heir of Frederick the Simple by his first wife Constance of Aragon. As she was thirteen years old at the time of her father's death in 1377, her government was effectively taken over by four baronial families who styled themselves "vicars".

Unrest 

The regent named by Maria's father, Artale Alagona, was initially forced to form a government with three other Vicars, including Francesco II count of Ventimiglia, Manfredi III Chiaramonte, count of Modica, and Guglielmo Peralta, count of Caltabellotta, a parity of exponents of the "Sicilian" and "Aragonese" parties. However, the four men ruled in their separate baronial lands alone. In 1379 she was kidnapped by count William Raymond of Montcada, Sicilian nobleman and member of the Aragonese House of Montcada, to prevent her marriage with Giangaleazzo Visconti, Duke of Milan, and imprisoned for two years at Licata. Montcada's move had been approved by her grandfather King Peter IV of Aragon. In 1382 Maria was rescued by an Aragonese fleet; she was taken first to Sardinia, then, in 1384, to Aragon, where she was married to Martin the Younger, the grandson of Peter IV (1390).

Co-reign 

In 1392 Maria and Martin returned with a military force and defeated the opposing barons, ruling jointly until Maria's death in 1401. At that time, Martin repudiated the Treaty of Villeneuve (1372) and ruled Sicily alone. She also survived their only son, Peter (1398–1400). The kingdom remained without a crown prince and this caused a succession crisis for Martin, who ruled by right of his wife. Frederick the Simple had named his illegitimate son, William, Count of Malta, as heir presumptive in the case of the extinction of his daughter's line. William had died in c. 1380, but he had a daughter, Joan, wife of the Sicilian nobleman Pietro di Gioeni. She, however, cannot have contested her uncle's claim since Martin continued to rule unopposed until his death.

Maria of Sicily died at Lentini in 1401.

References

External links

https://web.archive.org/web/20040820055312/http://www.mittelalter-genealogie.de/mittelalter/koenige/sizilien/maria_koenigin_1402.html

|-

1363 births
1401 deaths
14th-century Kings of Sicily
14th-century women rulers
14th-century Italian women
Nobility from Catania
Queens regnant in Europe
House of Barcelona (Sicily)
Dukes of Athens
Burials at Catania Cathedral
15th-century deaths from plague (disease)
Women in medieval European warfare
Women in war in Italy
Women in 14th-century warfare
Daughters of kings
Counts of Malta